Gastropteron is a genus of small colorful sea slugs, marine gastropod molluscs in the family Gastropteridae.

Species
Species within the genus Gastropteron include:
 Gastropteron bicornutum Baba & Tokioka, 1965
 Gastropteron chacmol Gosliner, 1989
 Gastropteron hamanni Gosliner, 1989
 Gastropteron japonicum Tokioka & Baba, 1964
 Gastropteron odhneri Gosliner, 1989
 Gastropteron pacificum Bergh, 1894
 Gastropteron rubrum (Rafinesque, 1814)
 Gastropteron sibogae Bergh, 1905
 Gastropteron sinense A. Adams, 1861
 Gastropteron vespertilium Gosliner & Armes, 1984 – flapping dingbat
 Gastropteron viride Tokioka & Baba, 1964

Synonymy:

 Gastropteron alboaurantium Gosliner, 1984 = Siphopteron alboaurantium (Gosliner, 1984)
 Gastropteron brunneomarginatum Carlson & Hoff, 1974 = Siphopteron brunneomarginatum (Carlson & Hoff, 1974)
 Gastropteron cinereum Dall, 1925 = Gastropteron pacificum Bergh, 1894
 Gastropteron citrinum Carlson & Hoff, 1974 = Siphopteron citrinum (Carlson & Hoff, 1974)
 Gastropteron flavobrunneum Gosliner, 1984 = Siphopteron flavobrunneum (Gosliner, 1984)
 Gastropteron flavum Tokioka & Baba, 1964 = Siphopteron flavum (Tokioka & Baba, 1964)
 Gastropteron fuscum Baba & Tokioka, 1965 = Siphopteron fuscum (Baba & Tokioka, 1965)
 Gastropteron ladrones Carlson & Hoff, 1974 = Siphopteron ladrones (Carlson & Hoff, 1974)
 Gastropteron meckeli Blainville, 1825 = Gastropteron rubrum (Rafinesque, 1814)
 Gastropteron michaeli Gosliner & Williams, 1988 = Siphopteron michaeli (Gosliner & Williams, 1988)
 Gastropteron pohnpei Hoff & Carlson, 1983 = Siphopteron pohnpei (Hoff & Carlson, 1983)

References

Gastropteridae